The Loves of Salammbo is a 1960 historical drama directed by Sergio Grieco. It is loosely based on the novel Salammbô by Gustave Flaubert.

Cast 

 Jacques Sernas: Mathos
 Jeanne Valérie: Salammbò
 Edmund Purdom: Narr Havas
 Riccardo Garrone: Hamilcar Barca
 Arnoldo Foà: Spendius
 Charles Fawcett : Hanon
 Brunella Bovo : Neshma (Italian version)
 Kamala Devi : Neshma (French version)
 Ivano Staccioli: Gell

Censorship

When Salammbò was first released in Italy in 1960 the Committee for Theatrical Review of the Italian Ministry of Cultural Heritage and Activities reviewed the film. They decided that in order for the film to be screened publicly, the Committee recommended the removal of the scene in which Mathos, lying in bed, sensuously kisses Salammbò on her neck and her chest  repeatedly. The reason for the restriction, cited in the official documents, is that the scene is considered to be offensive to decency and morality. The official document number is: N° 31319, it was signed on 30 Mar 1960 by Minister Umberto Tupini.

Release
The Loves of Salammbo was released in Italy on 16 September 1960 with a 110-minute running time. It was released in the United States in October 1962 with a 72-minute running time.

References

Footnotes

Sources

External links

1960 films
1960s adventure drama films
Peplum films
French drama films
Films directed by Sergio Grieco
Films set in Carthage
Works based on Salammbô
CinemaScope films
Films based on French novels
Films based on historical novels
Films set in the 3rd century BC
Sword and sandal films
1960 drama films
Films set in Tunisia
Films based on works by Gustave Flaubert
1960s Italian films
1960s French films